Looop Lapeta is 2022 Indian Hindi-language comedy thriller film directed by Aakash Bhatia and jointly produced by Sony Pictures Films India, Ellipsis Entertainment and Aayush Maheshwari. An official adaptation of the award-winning German film Run Lola Run by Tom Tykwer, the film stars Taapsee Pannu  and Tahir Raj Bhasin in the lead roles. The film premiered on 4 February 2022 on Netflix.

Plot 
Savina "Savi" Borkar is a promising track-and-field athlete whose career is ruined by a knee injury. While recovering from surgery at the hospital, she decides to commit suicide, only to be stopped by Satyajeet "Satya", a small-time, never-to-do-well crook. They fall in love and begin a relationship, which her father Atul disapproves of. One day, Satya is tasked by his boss Victor to deliver a package (implied to be a narcotics consignment) to an address and collect ₹ 5,000,000 in 80 minutes. Satya delivers the package and collects the cash, but decides to gamble it, so he can return Victor's share and keep the winnings for himself. While on his way to a casino, he gets high with a stranger and loses the bag of cash on a bus. Realizing his life is in danger if he doesn't return Victor's money, Satya calls Savi in a panic. Savi, who has just found out that she's pregnant, decides to ask Atul for the money.

On her way to Atul's gym, Savi interacts with Jacob, a cab driver whose girlfriend Julia is marrying another man. Jacob refuses to drive Savi, so she vandalizes his cab, attracting the attention of policeman David. Savi asks Atul for money, but they get into an argument as Atul was her coach and their relationship soured after Savi's injury. Savi blames Atul for dating a man after her mother's death. The two cannot reconcile and Savi leaves empty-handed. David spots her and gives chase but she evades him by hiding at Julia's wedding. Meanwhile, bumbling brothers Appu and Gappu plan to rob their father Mamlesh's jewelry store. Satya arrives at the store with the same idea, and a Mexican standoff ensues. Savi distracts everyone by throwing a brick through a glass window, allowing Satya to escape with the money. However, the brothers catch up to them in an alley, and Mamlesh arrives and shoots and kills Satya. Over a flashback, Satya relates the story of Savitri, who tricked Yama, the god of death, into sparing her husband Satyavan, despite Satyavan being fated to die. The day then resets to Savi finding out that she's pregnant, essentially granting her a second chance at saving Satya.

As the second iteration begins, Savi takes Satya's call and asks him to stay put and not chase after the bus. As she tries to reach her father's gym, she gets into an altercation with a man, once again attracting the attention of David, who chases her into Jacob's cab and forces Jacob to drive at gunpoint, but they crash into the bus containing the cash. Savi, relatively unharmed, steals David's gun and holds Atul at gunpoint, but he doesn't have any money. As she leaves the gym, David chases her into Julia's wedding, and she hides in Julia's dressing room. There, Julia rants about the difficult situation she finds herself in, since she wants to marry Jacob. Meanwhile Jacob however climbs till the baranda of Julie's room. However, Savi advises her to leave Jacob and go through with the wedding, which Jacob overhears. As Julia takes the advice and kisses her husband-to-be Robert, a shocked Jacob falls off the balcony and severely injures himself. As Satya wanders near the jewelry store, he gets into an argument with the brothers and they take his gun. When Savi arrives, she tells Satya that they will rob the brothers once the brothers have robbed the shop. This plan works, but Jacob arrives and kills Satya as revenge for Savi ruining his life. The day resets again.

Once the third iteration sets into motion, Savi decides to right her wrongs in order to manipulate events to save Satya. She apologizes to her father and the two reconcile, each agreeing to make an effort to get along with the other's boyfriend. She gets into Jacob's cab and convinces him that he must fight for Julia if he truly loves her. They drive to the wedding, where Savi helps Jacob and Julia elope. She steals a bag containing cash gifts for the wedding, then gambles that money and wins big, gaining enough cash to pay Victor back. Meanwhile, the brothers create a fake kidnapping situation so they can extract ransom money from their father. When Satya goes to rob the store, Mamlesh recognizes him as a former customer and hatches a plan with him to fake a robbery to collect insurance money. When the brothers arrive to act out the kidnapping, Mamlesh turns on Satya, only to realize that Satya had emptied his gun. As Satya leaves the store with the money, David and the police are responding to the hostage situation, but mistake him for a civilian and let him go. Satya meets with Savi and she reveals she is pregnant; they decide to get married. They deliver Victor's cash, and still have Savi's winnings left over. As the film ends, Satya notices the stranger on the bus who took his bag and begins chasing after him.

Cast 
 Taapsee Pannu as Savina Borkar aka Savi
 Tahir Raj Bhasin as Satyajeet aka Satya
 Dibyendu Bhattacharya as Victor
 Shreya Dhanwanthary as Julia
Rajendra Chawla as Shree Mamlesh Charan Chaddhaji
KC Shankar as Atul Borkar
Manik Papneja as Appu
Raghav Raj Kakker as Gappu
Bhupesh Bandekar as David Colaco
Sameer Kevin Roy as Jacob
Alistar Bennis as Robert
Varun Pande as Yash
 Priya Paramita Paul as Zoya

Production 
The principal photography of the film began in November 2020 and wrapped up in February 2021. Yash Khanna and Saumit Deshpande handled the cinematography for the entire shoot.

Soundtrack 

The soundtrack of the film has songs composed by Sidhant Mago, Mayank Mehra, Santanu Ghatak, Rahul Pais and Nariman Khambata, with lyrics written by Sidhant Mago, Santanu Ghatak and Siddhant Kaushal.

The background score has been composed by Rahul Pais and Nariman Khambata (The Jamroom).

Reception 
Umesh Punwani of Koimoi rated the film 4 out of 5 stars and wrote "Looop Lapeta not just touches a technical peak but is also backed by an extremely strong story & memorable performances. A visually appealing, soul-satisfying experience". Stutee Ghosh of The Quint rated the film 3.5 out of 5 stars and wrote "It's this playfulness that ultimately works for Looop Lapeta though a tighter edit would have heightened its impact". Renuka Vyavahare of The Times Of India rated the film 3.5 out of 5 stars and wrote "Looop Lapeta is a refreshing attempt to move beyond the mundane".

References

External links 
 
 

Indian remakes of foreign films
Sony Pictures Networks India films
Hindi-language Netflix original films